Mackie  is a surname of Scottish origin. Notable people with the surname include:

 Alec Mackie (1903–1984), Irish footballer with Arsenal F.C. and Portsmouth F.C.
 Alex Mackie (1870–unknown), Scottish football manager with Middlesbrough F.C.
 Andrew Mackie (born 1984), Australian rules footballer with the Geelong Football Club
 Anthony Mackie (born 1978), American actor
 Bob Mackie (born 1940), American fashion designer 
 Calvin Mackie (born 1969), American  entrepreneur (Older brother of actor Anthony Mackie)
 Charles Mackie (Scottish footballer) (1882–unknown), played for Aberdeen, West Ham United and Manchester United
 Charles Mackie (New Zealand footballer), New Zealand international footballer in the 1930s
 Cloe and Holly Mackie (born 1997), twin British actresses
 Darren Mackie (born 1982), Scottish footballer
 David Mackie (1836–1910), a founder and builder of Scammon, Kansas, US; the first President of the Scammon State Bank
 Gael Mackie (born 1988), Canadian gymnast and Olympic athlete
 Greg Mackie, Australian arts promoter
 Greg Clark Mackie (born 1949), American audio engineer and inventor
 Howard Mackie (born 1958), American comic book editor and writer
 Jamie Mackie (born 1985), Scottish footballer
 Jason Mackie (born 1968), New Zealand rugby league player
 Jerry Mackie (1894–1959), Scottish footballer with Portsmouth F.C. and Southampton  F.C.
 Jerry Mackie (politician) (born 1962), Alaska businessman and state legislator
 John Mackie (disambiguation), several people
 John Leslie Mackie (1917–1981), Australian philosopher
 Lise Mackie (born 1975), Australian freestyle swimmer
 Neil Mackie (born 1946), Scottish tenor and professor of music
 Osbert Mackie (1868–1927), English rugby union player
 Pat Mackie (1914–2009), New Zealand miner and unionist
 Pearl Mackie, British actress, dancer, and singer
 Penelope Mackie, British academic
 Sir Peter Mackie (1855–1924), a Scottish whisky distiller
 Peter Mackie (footballer) (born 1958), Scottish footballer
 Philip Mackie (1918–1985), British film and television screenwriter
 Samuel Joseph Mackie (1823–1902), British geologist, inventor, and editor
 Sean Mackie (born 1998), Scottish footballer
 Shamele Mackie (born 1978), American rapper
 Sheila Mackie (1928–2010), English painter and illustrator 
 Thomas Mackie (disambiguation), several people
 William Mackie, several people

See also
Mackey (disambiguation)
McKie (surname)

References

English-language surnames